The 1989 Giro del Trentino was the 13th edition of the Tour of the Alps cycle race and was held on 8 May to 10 May 1989. The race started in Riva del Garda and finished in Arco. The race was won by Mauro-Antonio Santaromita.

General classification

References

1989
1989 in road cycling
1989 in Italian sport
May 1989 sports events in Europe